Yongjing Township is a rural township in Changhua County, Taiwan.

Geography
It has a population total of 35,436 and an area of  It is the third smallest township in Changhua County after Xianxi and Beidou.

Administrative divisions

Villages of the township are Dongning (東寧村), Duao (獨鰲村), Dunhou (敦厚村), Fuxing (福興村), Fuzun (浮圳村), Gangxi (港西村), Guangyun (光雲村), Hulian (瑚璉村), Lunmei (崙美村), Lunzi (崙子村), Nangang (湳港村), Nanqi (湳墘村), Sifang (四芳村), Tongan (同安村), Tongren (同仁村), Wubian (五汴村), Wufu (五福村), Xinzhuang (新莊村), Yongbei (永北村), Yongdong (永東村), Yongnan (永南村), Yongxi (永西村), Yongxing (永興村), and Zhuzi (竹子村).

Tourist attractions
 Yusan Hall

Transportation

 TRA Yongjing Station: Although there is a train station in Yongjing, it's very distant from the central part of the township.

References

External links

 Yongjing Government website

Townships in Changhua County